Friedrich Ernst Peter Paul Maria Graf von Thun und Hohenstein (born 30 June 1942) is an Austrian actor. He appeared in more than a hundred films since 1958.

His son Max von Thun is also an actor.

Selected filmography

References

External links
 

1942 births
Living people
Austrian male film actors
Austrian male television actors
20th-century Austrian male actors
21st-century Austrian male actors
Austrian nobility
Friedrich
People from Kroměříž District
Austrian people of Moravian-German descent